Nafenopin is a hypolipidemic agent.

References

Hypolipidemic agents
Tetralins
Phenol ethers